The 2010 Extreme Rules was the second annual Extreme Rules professional wrestling pay-per-view (PPV) event produced by World Wrestling Entertainment (WWE). It was held for wrestlers from the promotion's Raw and SmackDown brand divisions. The event took place on April 25, 2010, at the 1st Mariner Arena in Baltimore, Maryland. It replaced Backlash as the post-WrestleMania pay-per-view and was the first Extreme Rules event to feature the titular Extreme Rules match.

The concept of Extreme Rules is that the event features various hardcore-based matches. There were eight matches scheduled on the event's card, all of which were contested under a hardcore stipulation. There was also one dark match that occurred before the live broadcast. In the main event, John Cena defeated Batista in a Last Man Standing match to retain Raw's WWE Championship. In SmackDown's main match, which was an interpromotional match, Jack Swagger defeated Raw's Randy Orton in an Extreme Rules match to retain the World Heavyweight Championship. The event received 182,000 pay-per-view buys, the same as the figure achieved by the 2009 Backlash event.

Production

Background 
In 2009, World Wrestling Entertainment (WWE) established Extreme Rules as a gimmick pay-per-view (PPV), replacing One Night Stand. Just like One Night Stand, the concept of the show was that the event featured various matches that were contested under hardcore rules. The defunct Extreme Championship Wrestling promotion, which WWE acquired in 2003, originally used the "extreme rules" term to describe the regulations for all of its matches; WWE adopted the term and has since used it in place of "hardcore match" or "hardcore rules". While the inaugural 2009 event had originally been described as a continuation of the One Night Stand chronology, the 2010 Extreme Rules event was noted by WWE to be only the second event under a new chronology, thus establishing Extreme Rules as its own annual event. Although the second event in the Extreme Rules chronology, it was the first to feature the titular Extreme Rules match, among other hardcore-based matches. The event took place on April 25, 2010, at the 1st Mariner Arena in Baltimore, Maryland and featured wrestlers from the Raw and SmackDown brands. Extreme Rules 2010 also replaced Backlash as the post-WrestleMania pay-per-view.

Storylines 
The professional wrestling matches at Extreme Rules involved professional wrestlers performing as characters in scripted events pre-determined by the hosting promotion, WWE. Results were predetermined by WWE's writers on the Raw and SmackDown brands, while storylines were produced on WWE's weekly television shows, Monday Night Raw and SmackDown.

The main storyline from the Raw brand featured John Cena and Batista feuding over the WWE Championship. The feud had begun several months previously and been a feature of several pay-per-views, including WrestleMania XXVI, where Cena defeated Batista to win the championship. Following WrestleMania, on the April 5 episode of Raw, Batista attacked Cena after a match. It was announced that Batista would receive his rematch in a Last Man Standing match at Extreme Rules.

World Heavyweight Champion Jack Swagger from the SmackDown brand was scheduled to face Raw wrestler Randy Orton. Swagger won the Money in the Bank ladder match at WrestleMania, earning a contract for a guaranteed championship match at the time and place of his choosing. He used the contract on the April 2 episode of SmackDown, defeating Chris Jericho to win the World Heavyweight Championship after Jericho had been attacked by Edge. After a number one contender's match between Jericho and Edge ended in a double count-out, Raw guest host David Hasselhoff announced that Swagger would face Orton, who had beaten Swagger on two occasions, in an Extreme Rules match.

Chris Jericho and Edge also had a scheduled match on the card. Edge returned from injury at the Royal Rumble, winning the Royal Rumble match, and earning a match for a championship of his choosing at WrestleMania. Edge elected to wrestle then-World Heavyweight Champion Jericho, but lost. On the following episode of SmackDown, after being refused a rematch, Edge attacked Jericho, allowing Jack Swagger to cash in his Money in the Bank contract and win the championship. After a number one contender's match between Jericho and Edge went to a double count-out, it was announced that they would face each other in a steel cage match.

The secondary rivalry from the Raw brand heading into Extreme Rules was between Triple H and Sheamus. Sheamus felt that Triple H was responsible for him losing the WWE Championship at the Elimination Chamber pay-per-view, and so challenged him to a match at WrestleMania, but lost. As a result, the following night on Raw, Sheamus attacked Triple H with a lead pipe, and it was announced that the two would meet in a Street Fight at Extreme Rules.

CM Punk and Rey Mysterio had been feuding for several months prior to Extreme Rules, which included Punk tormenting Mysterio in front of his wife and children. They wrestled at WrestleMania, with Mysterio winning, allowing him to avoid being forced to join Punk's stable, The Straight Edge Society. When inducting members into The Straight Edge Society, Punk shaved their hair while retaining long hair himself; as a result, Mysterio challenged him to a match at Extreme Rules with a stipulation that if Punk lost, he would have his head shaved.

Also announced for the card was a match for the Women's Championship between the champion, Michelle McCool, and Beth Phoenix. The feud began when Phoenix objected to SmackDown Consultant Vickie Guerrero aligning with Team Lay-Cool (McCool and Layla) and refusing to grant Phoenix a title match. After earning her championship match, Phoenix was attacked and humiliated on the April 23 episode of SmackDown by Team Lay-Cool, who hit her with an ironing board and drew on her while unconscious with lipstick to set up an Extreme Makeover match.

The final match on the card was between former tag team partners, Shad Gaspard and JTG. After Cryme Tyme lost a tag team match on the April 2 episode of SmackDown, Gaspard turned on JTG and attacked him, setting up a strap match between the two.

Event

Preliminary matches
The pay-per-view opened with Sheamus attacking Triple H with a pipe.

Following the attack, Unified WWE Tag Team Champions ShoMiz (Big Show and United States Champion The Miz) came to the ring and complained about not having a match for the night, prompting SmackDown general manager Theodore Long to make a tag team gauntlet match for them against three other teams, with the winners earning a future tag team championship match. The first team was John Morrison and R-Truth, who lost when Morrison was disqualified for refusing to release a hold on Big Show by a five count. The next team was Montel Vontavious Porter and Mark Henry, who also lost after Miz pinned MVP following a KO Punch from Big Show. The final team was The Hart Dynasty, who won after Kidd pinned Miz following a Hart Attack.

Next, CM Punk faced Rey Mysterio, where if Punk lost he would have his head shaved bald. During the match, Luke Gallows and Serena attacked Mysterio on the outside and were banned from ringside. At the conclusion of the match, a masked man attacked Mysterio with a Fallaway Powerbomb on the floor, which allowed Punk to perform a Go To Sleep on Mysterio and pin him.

After that, JTG wrestled Shad in a Strap match, where the objective was to touch all four turnbuckles while connected to the opponent. Shad used his size advantage to overpower JTG for most of the match. The conclusion of the match came when Shad had JTG on his back and began to tag corners, unaware that JTG was doing the same. After touching the third corner, JTG performed a Box Cutter on Shad and touched the final corner to win the match.

In the fourth match, Jack Swagger defended the World Heavyweight Championship against Randy Orton in an Extreme Rules match. At the conclusion of the match, Orton attempted an RKO on a chair but Swagger countered by throwing Orton through the chair. Swagger then performed a gutwrench powerbomb on Orton and pinned him to retain the World Heavyweight championship. After the match, Orton performed an RKO on Swagger on the floor.

When Orton was leaving the ring, Sheamus came out carrying a pipe for his street fight with Triple H. At the start of the match, Triple H attacked Sheamus and executed a spinebuster. Triple H attempted a Pedigree, but Sheamus countered and began to work over Triple H, executing a neckbreaker on the floor on Triple H. Back in the ring, Triple H performed a DDT on Sheamus, who executed an Irish Curse Backbreaker for a near-fall. On the entrance ramp,  Triple H attacked Sheamus with a kendo stick and attempted a Pedigree, but Sheamus countered with a Back Body Drop onto the entrance ramp and executed a Brogue Kick. Back in the ring, Sheamus executed another Brogue Kick. As the referee checked on Triple H, he pushed him aside and in a final act of defiance performed the famous "crotch chop", taunting Sheamus. Sheamus executed two more Brogue Kicks, following which he pinned Triple H to win the match. After this, he posed on top of the knocked out Triple H before leaving as the decisive winner. After, the officials tried  to help Triple H backstage, but Sheamus came out again and executed a fifth Brogue Kick. Triple H was carried out on a stretcher and not seen again for almost 10 months.

Later, Michelle McCool defended the Women's Championship against Beth Phoenix in an Extreme Makeover match. At the conclusion of the match, Phoenix performed a Glam Slam on McCool and pinned her to win the title.

The next match was a Steel Cage match between Edge and Chris Jericho. When Jericho attempted to retrieve a chair, Edge stopped him but Jericho slammed the steel cage door on him. Jericho then attempted to strike Edge with the chair but Edge ducked and performed a spear on Jericho for a near-fall. Jericho then performed a Springboard Codebreaker on Edge for a near-fall. Edge performed another spear on Jericho to win the match.

Main event
In the main event, John Cena defended the WWE Championship against Batista in a Last Man Standing match. Cena performed an Attitude Adjustment onto a chair on Batista, who stood at an eight count. Batista performed two Spears on Cena, who stood at an eight count each time. Cena attempted the STF but Batista countered, knocking Cena through a table; Cena stood at a nine count. Batista threw Cena through the barricade but Cena stood at a nine count. Cena performed an Attitude Adjustment through the announce table on Batista, who stood at a nine count. Batista performed a Spinebuster through a table on Cena, who stood at a nine count. Batista performed a Batista Bomb on Cena, who stood at a nine count. Cena applied the STF on Batista, who stood at a nine count. Cena incapacitated Batista by tying Batista's feet to the ring post with duct tape. Batista was unable to answer the 10 count, allowing Cena to retain the title.

Reception
In August 2010, WWE reported that the event had received 182,000 pay-per-view buys, down on what the previous year's event had.

Aftermath
Because The Hart Dynasty defeated ShoMiz at Extreme Rules, they received a tag team championship match the next night on Raw, which they won. After the match Big Show turned face and punched The Miz right through his jaw. Big Show moved to the SmackDown brand and became number one contender for the World Heavyweight Championship at Over the Limit.

The feud between CM Punk and Rey Mysterio continued after Extreme Rules. A match combining the stipulations of their matches from Extreme Rules and WrestleMania XXVI was announced for Over the Limit in which if Mysterio lost he would have to join the Straight Edge Society and if Punk lost he would have to shave his head. At Over The Limit, Mysterio defeated Punk and forced Punk to shave his head.

After Extreme Rules, Randy Orton started a feud with Edge. A match was set up between the two at Over The Limit, ending in a double countout.

Jack Swagger entered into a program with the Big Show, against whom Swagger defended the World Heavyweight Championship at Over The Limit. At Over the Limit Swagger lost via disqualification, retaining the title.

Triple H was sidelined for the rest of the year and came back in February 2011 to confront The Undertaker. A week later when he returned, he attacked Sheamus to end the feud.

The feud between Batista and John Cena continued after Extreme Rules. Batista earned a rematch for the WWE Championship at Over the Limit by defeating Randy Orton and Sheamus in a number one contender's match, but Cena defeated Batista at the event in an "I Quit" Match. The next night, Raw general manager Bret Hart told Batista he had to qualify for the WWE Championship Fatal-4-Way at the eponymous pay-per-view, but he refused and lost to Randy Orton by forfeit. Batista then quit WWE.

After capturing the WWE Women's Championship, Beth Phoenix tore her ACL on the May 6 episode of Superstars during a singles match against Rosa Mendes, which Phoenix won with a roll-up. Phoenix eventually dropped the WWE Women's Championship to Layla in a 2-on-1 handicap match on the May 14 edition of SmackDown. After being out of action for six months, Phoenix returned at Survivor Series to save Natalya from an attack by LayCool. In December at TLC, Phoenix and Natalya defeated LayCool in a Divas Tag Team Tables match.

In April 2011, the promotion ceased using its full name with the "WWE" abbreviation becoming an orphaned initialism.

Results

Gauntlet match

References

External links
Official Extreme Rules website

2010 in Maryland
2010
Events in Baltimore
Professional wrestling in Baltimore
2010 WWE pay-per-view events
April 2010 events in the United States